This is a list of islands of Senegal.

Islands

References 

Senegal
Islands